The FSA Eligibility List is a list of tens of thousands of medical items that have been determined to be qualified expenses for flexible spending accounts in the United States. The U.S. Internal Revenue Service outlines eligible product categories in its published guidelines. These guidelines are interpreted by the Special Interest Group for IIAS Standards (SIG-IS) to form eligibility criteria for medical expenses. These criteria provide official interpretation of U.S. Internal Revenue Service guidance regarding eligible product categories.

Eligibility list
Eligible products are separated into two categories:
 FSA-ok Items (Products eligible without a prescription)
 FSA-Rx Items (Products require a prescription for eligibility)

FSA Eligible Items
Allergy Medicine*
Anti-Fungal Treatments
Anti-Itch Treatments
Aspirin & Baby Aspirin
Athletic Braces & Supports
Bandages
Blood Pressure Monitors
Chest Rubs
Cold Sore Treatments
Cough Drops & Spray
Cough, Cold & Flu Medicine*
Ear Drops & Wax Removers
Eye Drops
Eye Glass & Lens Accessories
External Pain Relievers
Feminine Hygiene Products*
Feminine Personal Care Treatments*
First Aid Kits
First Aid Treatments & Supplies
Home Medical Equipment
Heartburn medications*
Heating Pads & Wraps
Hemorrhoidal Treatments
Hot & Cold Packs
Laxatives
Lip Balm
Menstrual Supplies*
Motion Sickness Aids
Nasal Spray
Oral Pain Remedies
Orthopedic & Surgical Supports
Pain Relieving Creams & Pads
Pain Relieving Medication*
Shoe Insoles & Inserts
Skin Treatments
Sleep Aids
Stomach & Digestive Aids
Sunscreen
Thermometers
Topical Skin Treatments
Vaporizers & Inhalers
Wart Removers
(*-Added by the CARES Act)

Using the FSA debit card
The master eligibility list is referenced at the point of sale when a purchase is made with an FSA debit card. When a purchased item matches up with an item on the eligibility list and there are sufficient funds, the FSA reimbursement is automatic and no further action is necessary by the account holder.

Submitting receipts for reimbursement
Regular credit card purchases may be reimbursed by an FSA only when an itemized receipt is submitted to the account holder's FSA administrator following a purchase. Credit card purchases do not reference the eligibility list at the point of sale, but are manually reviewed by the FSA administrator following submission of transaction receipts.

References

Healthcare in the United States